Deep Cuts may refer to:

 Deep Cuts (Mr. Big album)
 Deep Cuts (The Knife album)
 Deep Cuts (Strawbs album)
 Deep Cuts (A Perfect Circle album)
 Deep Cuts (Yellowcard album)
 Deep Cuts, Volume 1 (1973–1976) (Queen album)
 Deep Cuts, Volume 2 (1977–1982) (Queen album)
 Deep Cuts, Volume 3 (1984–1995) (Queen album)
 Deep Cuts (The Choir album)

See also
 Deep Cut, 2008 play by Philip Ralph
 Deepcut (disambiguation)